Isipathana College (formerly known as Greenlands College) is a national school for boys located in Colombo, Sri Lanka. Founded in January 1952, the school was initially named Isipathana Maha Vidalaya, but is now referred to simply as "Isipathana".

History

The first principal was B. A. Kuruppu (1952 -1959), who was then the vice-principal of Blue Street Central College, Kotahena.

The initial admissions were made by a Board composed of principals of Royal College Colombo and Thurstan Colleges, and the headmaster of Royal Preparatory School; classes were organised in all three streams - Sinhala, Tamil and English, with a tutorial staff of seven teachers.

The first principal designed the college crest with the assistance of J. D. A. Perera and Stanley Abeysinghe of Heywood School of Art. It consists of a lighted lamp and an opened book with the motto "Strive with determination" below. The college colours are dark and light green, which was selected from the college's name (Greenlands College). 

The first sports meet was held in March 1953, and the first prize-giving was in 1954.

The first issue of the college magazine came out in 1954. In 1956 Vihara Mandiraya and Chaitya were built to commemorate "Buddha Jayanthi year" at school premises. The college had adapted itself to the socio-cultural changes which were taking place since Buddha Jayanthi in 1956, which led to the renaming of the college in 1961. Greenlands Road had been renamed as Isipathana Mawatha after Isipathanaramaya Temple, and the school was renamed as Isipathana Maha Vidyalaya. Within a decade, Greenlands became Isipathana.

In 1962, the college was divided into two schools, Kanishta (junior) and Jeshta (upper) Vidyalayas (colleges), with two separate principals. In 1975 the Education Department amalgamated Kanishta Vidyalaya (junior college) with the Maha Vidyalaya (senior college).

In 1999 the schools were amalgamated into a single college under one principal.

The school currently has more than 5,000 students from grades 1 to 13.

Houses
The students are divided into four Houses. The names are derived from four poets - Thotagamuwe Sri Rahula Thera, Rabindranath Tagore, John Milton and Muhammad Iqbal. The houses compete to win the inter-house games.

 Tagore

Colour :  yellow 
 Rahula 

Colour :  red
 Milton

Colour :  blue
 Iqbal

Colour :  Green

Sports

Cricket 
An annual cricket contest match, Battle of Brothers, also called The Big Match, played against the school's traditional rival Thurstan College. The first Battle of Brothers was in 1963, and there have been 57 matches played, with 41 endings in a draw. Thurstan College won seven times and Isipathana College five times.

Rugby
In addition to the 'Abdul Jabar Trophy,' which is played with the traditional rivals Thurstan College, with most trophies won by Isipathana College.

The college commenced playing rugby as a competitive sport in 1963. Before this, it played friendly games at under 17 levels. The first official match was against St Anthony's College, Katugastota, where Isipathana won 8-3. In 1965 the school was officially affiliated as an SLRFU school.

Notable alumni

Principals

References

External links
Isipathana Online Information Center
Hockey
SLRFU Captains

National schools in Sri Lanka
Educational institutions established in 1952
Schools in Colombo
Boys' schools in Sri Lanka
1952 establishments in Ceylon